Nangavaram is a panchayat town in Karur district in the Indian state of Tamil Nadu.

Nangavaram is also home to the famous Nangavaram Sri Sundareshwarar temple.

Demographics
 India census, Nangavaram had a population of 16,428. Males constitute 49% of the population and females 51%. Nangavaram has an average literacy rate of 60%, higher than the national average of 59.5%: male literacy is 71%, and female literacy is 50%. In Nangavaram, 12% of the population is under 6 years of age.

References

Cities and towns in Karur district